The Apulian regional election of 1985 took place on 12 May 1985.

Events
Christian Democracy was by far the largest party, while the Italian Communist Party came distantly second. After the election Christian Democrat Salvatore Fitto was elected President of the Region at the head of a centre-left coalition (Organic Centre-left).

In 1988, after the sudden death in a car accident of Fitto, the post of President of the Region was given to Giuseppe Colasanto, a Christian Democrat too.

Results

Source: Ministry of the Interior

Elections in Apulia
1985 elections in Italy